Cosmotomidius vincus is a species of beetle in the family Cerambycidae. It was described by Vanessa S. Machado and Marcela L. Monné in 2009. It is known from Bolivia.

References

Pogonocherini
Beetles described in 2009